The Thomas Holt House is a property in Brentwood, Tennessee, which dates from c.1840 and that was listed on the National Register of Historic Places in 1988.  It has also been known as Holtland.

It includes Greek Revival, Central hall plan and other architecture.

The NRHP eligibility of the property was covered in a 1988 study of Williamson County historical resources.

Like the John Seward House and the James Sayers House, also NRHP-listed, it has a main entrance with Greek Revival details, including a two-story portico.

References

Houses on the National Register of Historic Places in Tennessee
Houses in Williamson County, Tennessee
Greek Revival houses in Tennessee
Central-passage houses in Tennessee
Houses completed in 1840
National Register of Historic Places in Williamson County, Tennessee